Heinrich Lausberg (12 October 1912 in Aachen; died 11 April 1992 in Münster) was a German rhetorician, classical philologist and historical linguist specialising in Romance studies. His 1960 treatise Handbook of literary rhetoric, is considered one of the most complete and detailed summaries of classical rhetoric from the perspective of Quintillian's four operations. His daughter, Marion Lausberg, is a classical philologist, too.

References

Romance philologists
Academic staff of the University of Bonn
1912 births
1992 deaths
Trope theorists
Academic staff of the University of Münster
German male writers